Oakwood, also known as the Abiel Leonard House, is a historic home located at Fayette, Howard County, Missouri.  It was built about 1834–1836, with alterations occurring in 1850–1851, 1856–1858, the 1890s, and 1938. It is a two-story, Federal style brick I-house with a two-story rear ell with a double gallery porch. The front facade features a small classical portico.  Also on the property are the contributing brick slave house, a second brick slave house (1857) adjoining an existing brick smokehouse, an ice house, and a fruit cellar.

It was listed on the National Register of Historic Places in 1982.

References

Houses on the National Register of Historic Places in Missouri
Federal architecture in Missouri
Houses completed in 1836
Buildings and structures in Howard County, Missouri
National Register of Historic Places in Howard County, Missouri